Kamnica is a settlement northeast of Ljubljana in the Municipality of Dol pri Ljubljani in the Upper Carniola region of Slovenia. It includes the hamlet of Sveta Helena.

History
In the past, Kamnica was known for black slate, which was mined here and used for slate roofing. It was also known for millstones. Saint Helena's Church, first mentioned in 1495, and Žerjav Castle, dating from the 16th-century, stand in the hamlet of Sveta Helena.

Notable people
Notable people that were born or lived in Kamnica include:
Josip Armič (1870–1937), education specialist and writer of beekeeping and hunting articles

References

External links

Kamnica on Geopedia

Populated places in the Municipality of Dol pri Ljubljani